The railway from Rémilly to Saarbrücken is a French and German 55-kilometre long railway line, that connects the French Grand Est region to the German city Saarbrücken. The railway was opened between 1851 and 1852. It is part of the international railway connection between Paris and Frankfurt am Main.

Route
The line branches off the Metz–Réding railway at Rémilly, and leaves it in a northeasterly direction. It crosses the industrial area around Saint-Avold and Forbach. It passes the German border, crosses the river Saar and joins the line from Trier to Saarbrücken after about 55 km.

Main stations
The main stations on the Rémilly–Saarbrücken railway are:
 Gare de Rémilly
 Gare de Forbach
 Saarbrücken Hauptbahnhof

Services
The Rémilly–Saarbrücken railway is used by the following passenger services:
Intercity-Express from Paris to Frankfurt am Main
TER Grand Est regional services

References

Railway lines in Grand Est
Railway lines in the Saarland
Railway lines opened in 1851
1852 establishments in Germany
Buildings and structures in Saarbrücken
Cross-border railway lines in Germany
Cross-border railway lines in France